The 40th New Zealand Parliament was a term of the Parliament of New Zealand. Its composition was determined by the 1981 election, and it sat until the 1984 election.

The 40th Parliament was the third and final term of the third National Party government. Robert Muldoon, who served as both Prime Minister and Minister of Finance, remained in power. The Labour Party, led by former Prime Minister Bill Rowling, had made significant gains (actually winning the largest portion of the popular vote), but remained in opposition. The Social Credit Party was the only other opposition party in the 40th Parliament, holding two seats.

The 40th Parliament consisted of ninety-two representatives, the same as in the previous election. All of these representatives were chosen by single-member geographical electorates, including four special Māori electorates.

Electoral boundaries for the 40th Parliament

Overview of seats
The table below shows the number of MPs in each party following the 1981 election and at dissolution:

Notes
The Working Government majority is calculated as all Government MPs less all other parties.

Initial composition of the 40th Parliament

There were no by-elections held during the term of the 40th Parliament.

Notes

References

New Zealand parliaments